The discography of American country artist Wilma Burgess consists of seven studio albums, one compilation album, twenty eight singles, and one other charted song. Graduating college in 1960, Burgess moved to Nashville, Tennessee to pursue a singing career. She cut her first single with United Artists Records in 1962 which had little success. Producer Owen Bradley was impressed by Burgess's vocals, signing her to a recording contract with Decca Records. In 1965, the Ray Griff-penned composition "Baby" became Burgess's breakthrough single, reaching the top ten on the Hot Country Singles chart. It was followed by a cover of Jeannie Seely's "Don't Touch Me", which reached the top twenty of the country chart. Her debut album which was also entitled Don't Touch Me (1965) and reached number three on the Billboard Top Country Albums chart. 

It was Burgess's next single release "Misty Blue" that would become her biggest success and signature song. It reached the top five of the country songs chart in 1966 and would later be covered by Eddy Arnold and Dorothy Moore respectively. Her second studio album Wilma Burgess Sings Misty Blue (1966) would also peak in the top ten of the country albums chart. Burgess had her final top-twenty hit in 1967 with "Tear Time", but continued releasing albums with Decca Records until 1969. A close of friend of Jim Reeves's wife, Burgess would sign a recording contract with Reeves's Shannon label in the early 1970s. Her duet with Buddy Logan entitled "Wake Me Into Love" (1974) would reach the top twenty of the Billboard country chart. In 1977, she released two singles with RCA Records. She released her final studio album in 1982 with Could I Have This Dance and retired shortly afterward.

Albums

Studio albums

Compilation albums

Singles

Other charted songs

Notes

References 

 
Discographies of American artists